Glyphipterix eumitrella is a species of sedge moth in the genus Glyphipterix. It was described by August Busck in 1914. It is found in Panama.

References

Moths described in 1914
Glyphipterigidae
Moths of Central America